James Wales may refer to:

 James Wales (artist) (1747–1795), Scottish painter
 James Albert Wales (1852–1886), caricaturist
 Jimmy Wales (born 1966), co-founder of Wikipedia

See also
 James Whale (1889–1957), British film director
 James Whale (radio presenter) (born 1951), British radio presenter